Giovanni Temini was an Italian engraver of the Baroque period. His name is affixed to a portrait dated 1622 of Carlo Gonzales, Duke of Mantua from 1627.

References

Artists from Mantua
Italian engravers
Italian Baroque painters
Year of death unknown
Year of birth unknown